The 2002–03 Irish League Cup (known as the CIS Insurance Cup for sponsorship reasons) was the 17th edition of Northern Ireland's secondary football knock-out cup competition. It concluded on 3 December 2002 with the final.

Linfield were the defending champions after their seventh League Cup win last season; a 3–1 victory over Glentoran in the previous final. This season both clubs met in the final again but this time Glentoran defeated Linfield 2–0 in the final to win their fourth League Cup overall, and second in three years. This was the fourth time in six years that the two clubs had met in the final, with Linfield coming out on top on all three of the previous occasions.

The twenty clubs taking part were divided into four groups of five clubs based on region. The clubs in each group played each other once, either at home or away. The top two clubs from each group then advanced to the quarter-finals where they played a single knock-out tie against another quarter-finalist. The semi-finals were played in the same format with the two winners of the ties advancing to the single match final.

Group stage

Eastern Region

Greater Belfast Region

Northern Region

Southern Region

Quarter-finals

Semi-finals

Final

References

Lea
2002–03 domestic association football cups
2002-03